Paul Gruson (24 December 1895 – 1969) was a German sculptor. His work was part of the sculpture event in the art competition at the 1932 Summer Olympics. Despite his Jewish ancestry, he managed to get the commission to design a monument in honor of the martyrs of the Nazi movement. Once the fact that he was "half-Jew" according to the Nazi racial calculus was discovered, Joseph Goebbels decided to grant him a special dispensation to avoid embarrassment.

References

1895 births
1969 deaths
20th-century German sculptors
20th-century German male artists
German male sculptors
Olympic competitors in art competitions
People from Charlottenburg